Antony Dhas (born 14 October 1988) is an Indian cricketer. He made his List A debut for Tamil Nadu in the 2015–16 Vijay Hazare Trophy on 13 December 2015.

References

External links
 

1988 births
Living people
Indian cricketers
Tamil Nadu cricketers
Place of birth missing (living people)